Why Planes Crash was an aviation documentary TV mini-series based on aircraft accidents and crashes. The series was created and named by producer Caroline Sommers, on behalf of NBC Peacock Productions. The series premiere on July 12, 2009, featured Captain Chesley "Sully" Sullenberger's incredible water ditching of U.S. Air Flight 1549 in the Hudson on January 15, 2009, popularly known as "Miracle on the Hudson". Three other ditchings were also featured: Ethiopian Airlines Flight 961, ALM Flight 980, and Pan Am Flight 6.

Originally run on MSNBC, each episode was narrated by Lester Holt. Original production ceased in 2015. The series is still in heavy rotation on The Weather Channel.

Plot
Normally, each episode would see three accidents discussed. Over the 43-minute program, aviation experts such as veteran pilot and founder of Safety Operating Systems John M. Cox, as well as former NTSB investigators John Goglia and Greg Feith, would discuss the events and what caused or led up to the crash. Similar to Air Crash Investigation, the show also featured state-of-the-art recreations and visuals to graphically illustrate what occurred during the accident.

In some episodes, a survivor (or multiple survivors) would explain what they experienced during the accident. For example, in the very first episode, Captain Balsey DeWitt of ALM Flight 980 was interviewed.

Episodes

Season 1

Season 2

Notes
In the episode "Sudden Impact", the narrator states the wrong flight number of Air Inter. It should be 148, not 5148. Also, the date is first given as December 20, 1992 (the correct date), but later it changes to December 22, 1992.

References

External links
 Why Planes Crash on The Weather Channel website.

American documentary television films
Documentary television series about aviation
The Weather Channel original programming
2009 American television series debuts
2015 American television series endings